Silene nocturna is a species of annual herb in the family Caryophyllaceae (carpetweeds). They have a self-supporting growth form and simple, broad leaves. Individuals can grow to 0.39 m.

Sources

References 

nocturna
Flora of Malta